Michael D. Cohen (born ) is a Canadian actor. He is best known for his role as Schwoz Schwartz in Henry Danger and its spinoffs, The Adventures of Kid Danger and Danger Force.

Life and career
Born in Winnipeg, Cohen started transitioning from female to male in his 20s, making the information publicly known only in 2019. He and his family moved to Richmond, British Columbia, when he was 10. As a fan of Carol Burnett and the other actors on The Carol Burnett Show, he was inspired to be an actor and writer, and won a Young Playwright's Contest at age 12.

Years after graduating from college, Cohen moved to Toronto, where he studied acting and landed his first voice over job, without an agent, on the animated TV series Pippi Longstocking. He began his career when he appeared in Moville Mysteries, shortly after which he appeared in Queer as Folk, Doc, RoboRoach, and Henry's World, as well as many commercials. In 2005, he won the national Moc Docs award for Best Mockumentary for his short film Jew Jube Lives—a rap parody based on the question, "If Eminem were Jewish and grew up in Thornhill, what would he be like?" He was the voice of Ty Archer in the animated TV series Grossology for which he and the ensemble received a Gemini Award nomination, the Canadian equivalent of an Emmy.

Since 2014, Cohen has played Schwoz Schwartz on the sitcom Henry Danger, a role he continues in the Henry Danger spinoff series Danger Force. He has appeared on shows such as Modern Family, The Real O'Neals, 2 Broke Girls, The Mindy Project, Backstrom, Eagleheart and Austin & Ally. His recent film credits include the comedy Suburbicon, directed by George Clooney and written by the Coen brothers; the Oscar-nominated film Whiplash; and  the Canadian Screen Award-nominated film It Was You Charlie, for which he was nominated for an ACTRA Award for Outstanding Lead Performance.

Cohen has dozens of commercial credits including Mini Starburst, FedEx, Capital One, Boston Market, Honda (with Patrick Warburton), and the Super Bowl Hulu Plus campaign with Will Arnett. Cohen was co-chair of the SAG-AFTRA Hollywood Conservatory at the American Film Institute l, and is a member of the National SAG-AFTRA Conservatory Committee. He has a master's degree in adult education focusing on transformative education for performers. He offers acting workshops and private audition coaching for actors in L.A., Toronto and around the world. He resides in Los Angeles.

Filmography

Accolades

References

External links
 
 

1970s births
21st-century Canadian male actors
Living people
Year of birth uncertain
Canadian male television actors
Canadian male voice actors
Male actors from Winnipeg
Male actors from British Columbia
Transgender male actors
Canadian male film actors
People from Richmond, British Columbia
Canadian transgender actors
Canadian expatriate male actors in the United States
21st-century Canadian LGBT people